The Gaiety School of Acting (GSA) is a drama school located on Essex Street West in Temple Bar, Dublin, Ireland. It was founded by theatre director Joe Dowling in 1986.

Organisation and location
The Gaiety School of Acting was founded in 1986 and is operated as a "self funded not-for-profit organisation". The school aims to train actors for theatre, film and television.

The school is based in Temple Bar, Dublin, with "Young Gaiety" classes also taking place in satellite locations in Bray and Malahide.

Courses
The school runs a two-year full-time Professional Actor Training course, part-time and youth courses in locations across Dublin, as well as a Masters of Arts in Theatre Practice in association with University College Dublin.

One year part-time courses include a Performance Year and Advanced Performance Year in Acting, and a Performance Theatre Company course.  Shorter ten-week courses are also offered.

The school also hosts courses for international students, community and outreach schemes for Leaving Cert students, and corporate training programmes covering communication skills, leadership, and team building events.

Writers
Writers that the school has commissioned include Marina Carr, Lally Katz and Gary Duggan.

Notable graduates
The full time actor-training programme has produced graduate actors who have appeared in Irish theatres, in film and television nationally and internationally, and in theatres across England including The Royal Shakespeare Company and The National Theatre in London. Graduates of the school have included:

See also
Gaiety Theatre (unaffiliated)

References

External links
The Gaiety School of Acting

Arts in Dublin (city)
Drama schools in Ireland
University College Dublin
Education in Dublin (city)
1986 establishments in Ireland